Whatever's Cool with Me is an EP by the American band Dinosaur Jr. It was released on Sire Records in 1991. It contains the "Whatever's Cool With Me" single and the European single of "The Wagon". The band supported the EP by touring with My Bloody Valentine. "Quicksand" is a cover of the David Bowie song.

A music video for the song "Whatever's Cool With Me" was shot at J Mascis's home in Amherst, Massachusetts, and was directed by Jim Spring and Jens Jurgensen. The EP sold more than 40,000 copies in its first six months of release.

Critical reception

The St. Petersburg Times deemed the release "an eight-song EP full of cacophonous noise and hectic delight." The Hartford Courant called it "a searing EP." The Seattle Times wrote that the EP showcases "the Dinosaur at its most irresistibly rapacious, the irreverent noisemakers The Replacements would have been if they hadn't turned into The Knack." Trouser Press opined that "only the brisk and tight 'Not You Again', in which Mascis marvels woefully at 'the mess I made again…how do I do it?,' displays the kind of small effort it takes to elevate slack rubbish into slacker art."

Track listing
CD Maxi-Single (Sire Records Company)

 "Whatever's Cool With Me" - 4:34
 "Sideways" - 4:14
 "Not You Again" - 2:32
 "The Little Baby" - 2:11
 "Pebbles + Weeds" - 5:25
 "Quicksand" (David Bowie, additional lyrics by J Mascis, contains the main guitar riff from "Andy Warhol") - 4:34
 "Thumb (live)" - 7:45
 "Keep the Glove (live)" - 3:16

12" Vinyl (Warner Music UK Ltd.)

Side A
 "Whatever's Cool With Me" - 4:34
 "Sideways" - 4:14
Side B
 "Thumb (live)" - 7:45
 "Keep the Glove (live)" - 3:16

CD, Maxi-Single (Blanco Y Negro, Warner Music UK Ltd.)

 "Whatever's Cool With Me" - 4:34
 "Sideways" - 4:14
 "Thumb (live)" - 7:45
 "Keep the Glove (live)" - 3:16

7" Vinyl (Blanco Y Negro)

 "Whatever's Cool With Me" - 4:34
 "Sideways" - 4:14

"The Little Baby", "Pebbles + Weeds", and "Quick Sand" are the B-sides from The Wagon single released in 1991.

References

Dinosaur Jr. albums
1991 EPs
Sire Records EPs